The Alberta Winter Games (AWG) is a Canadian provincial multi-sport event hosted in the province of Alberta. It is the winter portion of the multi-sport Alberta Games, which also involves the Alberta Summer Games and is strictly for amateur athletes. The inaugural year for the Alberta Winter Games was in 1976 and was hosted in Banff, Alberta.

This event is held independently from the national Canadian event, the Canada Winter Games. Since 2000, the Alberta Winter Games and the Alberta Summer Games have been held every two years in the same calendar year, a change made in order to help to align the Alberta Games' cycle with the Canada Games.

Sports

A total of 19 sports are a part of the Alberta Winter Games and include the following:

 
 
 
 
 
 
 
 
 
 

 
 
 
  Ringette
 
 
  Synchronized Swimming
 
  Amateur Wrestling

Events by year

2010

2012

2014

2016

See also
Canada Games
Canada Summer Games
Canada Winter Games
Western Canada Summer Games
BC Games
BC Summer Games
BC Winter Games
Saskatchewan Games
Manitoba Games
Ontario Games
Quebec Games

External links
 Website

Sports competitions in Alberta
Winter multi-sport events
Winter multi-sport events in Canada
1976 establishments in Alberta